The Mahindra Bolero is a SUV produced by Mahindra & Mahindra.

Design
The basic design is based on the Mahindra Armada Grand. The first-generation Bolero was equipped with a Peugeot  IDI engine which produced , although turbocharged versions with or without an intercooler were also available, raising power to  respectively. It is powered by a   turbocharged direct injection diesel engine.

In September 2011, the third generation Bolero was released, with a more thoroughly re-designed front with jewelled headlamps. In India it is powered by the  M2DiCR diesel engine with a "soft turbo", mated to a five-speed transmission. This latest engine meets the Bharat IV emissions standards.

Models and trims

The Bolero is offered in the Indian domestic market in the following trims:
 EX – The "no-frills" base model includes vinyl seats, basic digital instruments, and engine immobilization but lacks even the most rudimentary of modern conveniences such as power steering or air conditioning.
 SLE – This trim replaces vinyl with a fabric/vinyl mix, and adds power steering, air conditioning, a heater, a second row center armrest, a remote fuel lid opener, and a spare wheel cover
 SLX – Adds CD and MP3 capability, body color ORVM, a body color spare wheel cover insert, wood finish on the central console, power windows, central locking, keyless entry, and a 12-volt port.
 ZLX – the top-of-the-line ZLX trim adds the Mahindra Micro Hybrid System (similar to start/stop), a more advanced driver info system, exterior graphics, a rear windshield wiper, and VMS
 The DI is similar to the EX trim but is fitted with the rugged DI engine. The EX, SLE, SLX and ZLX meanwhile are available with the M2DiCR low-cost common rail engine, which meets the BS IV emissions standards (required in 13 major Indian cities)
 Bolero Power+ –  Powered by the mHAWKD70 engine, available in ZLX (top end), SLX, SLE, and LX variants. This model is  shorter than a regular Bolero, down to  thanks to smaller front and rear bumpers. The old 2.5-litre four-cylinder m2DiCR engine is replaced with the 1.5 three-cylinder mHawkD70 diesel. This produces more power (52.5 kilowatt/ 71 hp and torque remains same 195 nm) than earlier models. Otherwise, interiors and exteriors remain unchanged.
Now B4, B6 and B6 optional launched since April 2020.

An ambulance model is also available. The five-seat pickup version of the Bolero (nowadays known as the Bolero Camper) entered production in Uruguay as the "Cimarrón" in June 2004.

Bolero Camper
The Mahindra Bolero is an SUV-based pickup truck, available in AC and non-AC variants. Single or double cabin models are on offer. It was originally sold as the Bolero Single Cab or Bolero Double Cab, but from early 2002 the Double Cab model has been marketed as the Bolero Camper in India. It is powered by the  2523 cc turbo-charged direct injection diesel engine, although the new, cleaner M2DiCR has also been an option and in earlier years Peugeot engines were also fitted. Drive is manual with 4WD optional, power steering is available. Default tyres are 235/75 R15 Goodyear Wrangler radials. Mileage  fuel economy in city with AC. Mileage  fuel economy on highway at around 80 to 100 km/h with AC.

There is also a five-seat pickup version with a shorter cargo area called the Bolero Commando, as well as 7/8-seater soft top model called the Bolero Invader.

In popular culture
A modified Mahindra Bolero Camper is used by South African YouTuber Kevin Richardson to transport lions in his wildlife sanctuary. It is essentially the single-cabin variant fitted with a cage in which the lions are loaded into.

Bolero Neo 
The Mahindra Bolero Neo is a 5-7 seater suv fitted with a mHAWK 100 engine and MTT (Multi terrain technology). It uses a 3rd Generation Scorpio chassis which is useful for off road driving and has a  body with ladder-on-frame construction.

References

External links

 

Bolero
Cars of India
Cars introduced in 2000
2010s cars
Sport utility vehicles
All-wheel-drive vehicles